William Walond may refer to:

 William Walond Sr. (1719–1768), English composer and organist
 William Walond Jr. (1750–1836), English organist